NA-225 Sujawal is a constituency for the National Assembly of Pakistan.

Members of Parliament

2018-2022: NA-231 Sujawal

Election 2002 

General elections were held on 10 Oct 2002. Muhammad Ali Malkani of PML-Q won by 70,233 votes.

Election 2008 

General elections were held on 18 Feb 2008. Syed Ayaz Ali Shah Sheerazi of PML-Q won by 76,812 votes.

Election 2013 

General elections were held on 11 May 2013. Syed Ayaz Ali Shah Sheerazi of PML-N won by 88,954 votes and became the member of National Assembly.

Election 2018 

General elections were held on 25 July 2018.

See also
NA-224 Badin-II
NA-226 Thatta

References

External links 
Election result's official website

NA-238